Saint Genet, Actor and Martyr is a book by the French philosopher Jean-Paul Sartre about the writer Jean Genet, especially on his The Thief's Journal. It was first published in 1952. Sartre described it as an attempt "to prove that genius is not a gift but the way out that one invents in desperate cases." Sartre also based his character Goetz in his play The Devil and the Good Lord (1951) on his analysis of Genet's psychology and morality. Sartre has been credited by David M. Halperin with providing, "a brilliant, subtle, and thoroughgoing study of the unique subjectivity and gender positioning of gay men".

References

Sources 

 Halperin, David. 2012. How to be Gay. Cambridge, Massachusetts: Harvard University Press, 2012. . 
 Sartre, Jean-Paul. 1952. Saint Genet, comédien et martyr. In Oeuvres complètes de Jean Genet I. By Jean Genet. Paris: Éditions Gallimard.
 White, Edmund. 1993. Genet. Corrected edition. London: Picador, 1994. .

External links 

 https://en.wikiquote.org/wiki/Jean-Paul_Sartre#Saint_Genet,_Actor_and_Martyr_(1952)

1952 non-fiction books
Books by Jean-Paul Sartre
Éditions Gallimard books
French non-fiction books
Works about Jean Genet